Hell Sweet Hell is Fear My Thoughts' fourth album, released in 2005.

Track listing
"Intro" – 0:56
"Windows for the Dead" – 4:46
"In the Hourglass" – 4:28
"My Delight" – 4:40
"Sweetest Hell" – 3:48
"Dying Eyes" – 3:32
"Sadist Hour" – 4:14
"The Masters Call" – 4:14
"Ghosts of Time" – 4:11
"Satisfaction Guaranteed" – 4:22
"Tie Fighting" – 3:53
"...Trying to Feel" – 6:25

Reception

While Jason Macneil of Allmusic praised Fear My Thoughts, Macneil said the subject matter behind Hell Sweet Hell at times overshadowed the band's musical performance.

References

2005 albums
Fear My Thoughts albums